Sathariel is described in the Book of Enoch as the 17th Watcher of the 20 leaders of the 200 fallen angels. Michael Knibb believes the name to mean "Moon of God" or "Dawn of God" based on the Ge'ez copies of the Book of Enoch.

Sathariel is said to be the qliphah mirroring Binah, and described as concealers, by the Hermetic Order of the Golden Dawn and Aleister Crowley. In some modern organizations, Sathariel is said to be ruled by the archdemon Lucifuge Rofocale. Aleister Crowley instead associates Satan and Moloch with Sathariel.

Satariel have been described as the first qliphah after the passage over the Abyss, and conceptually portrayed as a black labyrinth of chaotic riddles.

References 

Watchers (angels)
Qliphoth